Port Isabel is a city in Cameron County, Texas, United States. It is part of the Brownsville–Harlingen–Raymondville and the Matamoros–Brownsville metropolitan areas. The population was 5,006 at the 2010 census.

The city's name is given to the Port Isabel Detention Center,  to the northwest next to the Port Isabel-Cameron County Airport.

History

Established as a town after the Mexican War of Independence, Port Isabel became an important cotton-exporting port before the American Civil War. The harbor, town and lighthouse all were fought over and exchanged hands during the Civil War.  
    
In September 1967, Hurricane Beulah caused extensive damage to much of the city. On July 23, 2008, Hurricane Dolly, a category 2 storm, also caused extensive damage to the city.

Geography

Port Isabel is located in eastern Cameron County at 26°4'25" North, 97°12'48" West (26.073675, –97.213234), on the western side of the south end of Laguna Madre, an estuary of the Gulf of Mexico. The Queen Isabella Causeway crosses Laguna Madre to South Padre Island on the Gulf shore.

Demographics

2020 census

As of the 2020 United States census, there were 5,028 people, 2,073 households, and 1,432 families residing in the city.

2000 census
As of the census of 2000, there were 4,965 people, 1,649 households, and 1,225 families residing in the city.  The population density was 2,215.5 people per square mile (853.8/km).  There were 2,055 housing units at an average density of 935.8 per square mile (360.7/km).  The racial makeup of the city was 79.67% White, 1.03% African American, 0.33% Native American, 0.25% Asian, 0.10% Pacific Islander, 15.54% from other races, and 3.08% from two or more races.  74.39% of the population were Hispanic or Latino of any race.

There were 1,649 households, out of which 36.0% had children under the age of 18 living with them, 53.1% were married couples living together, 16.6% had a female householder with no husband present, and 25.7% were non-families. 22.1% of all households were made up of individuals, and 7.8% had someone living alone who was 65 years of age or older.  The average household size was 2.95 and the average family size was 3.46.

In the city, the population was spread out, with 30.4% under the age of 18, 9.9% from 18 to 24, 25.6% from 25 to 44, 21.8% from 45 to 64, and 12.2% who were 65 years of age or older.  The median age was 32 years. For every 100 females, there were 94.1 males.  For every 100 females age 18 and over, there were 93.5 males.

The median income for a household in the city was $25,323, and the median income for a family was $26,077. Males had a median income of $17,105 versus $16,316 for females. The per capita income for the city was $11,239.  27.3% of the population and 21.7% of families were below the poverty line.   34.7% of those under the age of 18 and 14.3% of those 65 and older were living below the poverty line.

Government and infrastructure
Port Isabel maintains the Port Isabel-Cameron County Airport (FAA Code: PIL).

The United States Postal Service operates the Port Isabel Post Office.

U.S. Immigration and Customs Enforcement operates the Port Isabel Service Processing Center, which is located in an unincorporated area adjacent to Port Isabel-Cameron County Airport,  to the northwest of the center of Port Isabel.

Education

Children living in Port Isabel are zoned to schools in Point Isabel Independent School District. Children go to Garriga Elementary School (Grades K–2), Derry Elementary School, (3–5), Port Isabel Junior High School (6–8), and Port Isabel High School (9–12). All of the schools are located in Port Isabel. The mascot of both the junior high and high school is the Tarpon.
http://www.pi-isd.net/

In addition, children may apply to schools in South Texas Independent School District.

The designated community college for Point Isabel ISD and all of Cameron County is Texas Southmost College.

The Port Isabel Public Library serves Port Isabel.

References

External links

 Port Isabel Official Tourism & Information Website
 Museums of Port Isabel
 Port Isabel Chamber of Commerce
 Destination South Padre Island

Cities in Cameron County, Texas
Cities in Texas
Populated coastal places in Texas